was the third shōgun of the Kamakura shogunate. He was the second son of the Kamakura shogunate founder, Minamoto no Yoritomo. His mother was Hōjō Masako and his older brother was the second Kamakura shogun Minamoto no Yoriie.

He was the last head of the Minamoto clan of Japan.

He was an accomplished waka poet.

Early life 

After the death of Yoritomo in 1199, Sanetomo's grandfather Hōjō Tokimasa usurped the political and military power of the Shogunate, relegating the position and title of Sei-i Taishōgun, or shōgun, to a figurehead. Through hereditary succession, Sanetomo's older brother Yoriie became Sei-i Taishōgun in 1202, only to be stripped of the title a year later and put under house arrest for plotting against the Hōjō clan. This was presumably to keep the shōgun a child and thus needing a regent (shikken) to make decisions in his place. Shortly thereafter in 1203, Sanetomo became head of the Minamoto clan and was appointed Sei-i Taishōgun.

A year later, Yoriie was assassinated by the Hōjō. Sanetomo was never more than a puppet for his mother Hōjō Masako, who used him as a pawn in her war with her father Tokimasa; Tokimasa tried to depose his grandson a number of times, beginning in 1205, causing Sanetomo to fear for his life thereafter.

Waka poet 
Sanetomo, understanding his own powerlessness and not wanting to meet the same fate as his brother, put his time and energy into writing waka poetry and gaining posts within the powerless but honorary imperial court. Sanetomo was a talented poet, writing over 700 poems between the age 17 and 22 while he was tutored by Fujiwara no Teika. He published his private waka collection Kinkai Wakashū, even having one of his tanka included in the anthology Ogura Hyakunin Isshu ("100 Poems by 100 Poets"), a collection of Japanese poems of the Heian and early Kamakura periods. Sanetomo reached the third highest post of the imperial court, Udaijin (Minister of the Right or "vice-premier") in 1218.

Eventually, Sanetomo lapsed into inactivity and despair, plagued by fear of assassination and tormented by his chronic alcoholism (an addiction which Priest Eisai once tried to break by replacing alcohol with tea).

Death 

Under heavy snow on the evening of February 13, 1219 (Jōkyū 1, 27th day of the 1st month), Sanetomo was coming down from the Senior Shrine at Tsurugaoka Hachiman-gū after participating in a ceremony celebrating his nomination to Udaijin. His nephew, Kugyō, came out from beside the stone stairway of the shrine and assassinated him. For his act, he was himself beheaded a few hours later, thus bringing the Seiwa Genji line of the Minamoto clan and their rule in Kamakura to a sudden end.

Minamoto no Sanetomo was succeeded by Kujō Yoritsune as fourth shōgun of the Kamakura shogunate.

Family
 Father: Minamoto no Yoritomo
 Mother: Hōjō Masako

Eras of Sanetomo's bakufu
The years in which Sanetomo was shogun are more specifically identified by more than one era name or nengō.
 Kennin (1201–1204)
 Genkyū (1204–1206)
 Ken'ei (1206–1207)
 Jōgen (Kamakura period) (1207–1211)
 Kenryaku (1211–1213)
 Kenpō (1213–1219)
 Jōkyū (1219–1222)

See also
 Azuma Kagami

Notes

References
 Azuma Kagami, accessed on September 4, 2008; National Archives of Japan 特103-0001, Digitized image of the Azumakagami 
 
 
 
 
 
 Ponsonby-Fane, Richard Arthur Brabazon. (1962). Sovereign and Subject. Kyoto: Ponsonby Memorial Society.

External links
 New York Public Library Digital Gallery, an early photograph of Shrine steps where Sanetomo was killed.

1192 births
1219 deaths
12th-century Japanese people
13th-century Japanese poets
13th-century shōguns
Kamakura shōguns
Minamoto clan
People of Kamakura-period Japan
Assassinated Japanese people
Hyakunin Isshu poets
13th-century Japanese calligraphers
Deified Japanese people